Rosa abietina is a species of rose that was described by Jean Charles Marie Grenier. Rosa abietina is part of the genus Rosa, and the family Rosaceae.

References 

abietina